NGC 5615 is an irregular galaxy in the constellation Boötes. It is part of the Arp 178 triplet of interacting galaxies with NGC 5614 and NGC 5613. NGC 5615 forms a knot on the outer ring of NGC 5614, with a plume leading away from the knot.

References

External links

http://seds.org
Image NGC 5615

Boötes
5615
51435
Interacting galaxies
Irregular galaxies